The 2011–12 season was Oud-Heverlee Leuvens 10th competitive season since the 2002 fusion between Stade Leuven, Daring Club Leuven and Zwarte Duivels Oud-Heverlee. It was their first season in the Belgian Pro League after being promoted from the Belgian Second Division and the first time in 61 years a team from the city of Leuven played in the highest division. OH Leuven finished in 14th place, one place clear of the relegation zone, thereby prolonging their stay at the top flight. Their cup run was unsuccessful, losing out to Rupel Boom form the third division in round 6, which was the round where the team entered the cup.

Key dates

Pre-season
 05.05.2011: During the official celebration of the promotion at the Leuven city hall, it is announced that coach Ronny Van Geneugden has signed a new contract agreement, linking him to Oud-Heverlee Leuven for the next four seasons.
 30.05.2011: Jordan Remacle, one of the key players for OHL during the previous season with 16 goals and 20 assists, signs a new contract until 2014.
 15.06.2011: OHL signs 28-year-old midfielder and 2-time Belgian international Kevin Roelandts from Zulte Waregem  and also announces on the official website that an agreement has been found to sign Frederik Boi from Cercle Brugge. Cercle Brugge fans react surprised to see Boi leave after he has spent the last 22 years with the club and soon after Cercle Brugge officially denies that an agreement has been found and states that Boi has a contract running for two more years at Cercle.
 20.06.2011: After more than a month of rumours and false transfer announcements, it is finally confirmed that Tunisian forward Hamdi Harbaoui is leaving Oud-Heverlee Leuven. Harbaoui was the top scorer in the 2010–11 Belgian Second Division with 25 goals, but decided to move to Lokeren. Later on the same day, OHL announced three new signings: defender Jorn Vermeulen from Club Brugge and midfielders Thomas Azevedo and Emmerik De Vriese from second division teams Lommel United and Antwerp respectively.
 22.06.2011: Belgian Pro League fixtures for the 2011–12 season are announced. Oud-Heverlee Leuven opens the season with a home match against Anderlecht.
 24.06.2011: it is announced that supporters of OHL are massively buying season tickets, with already 4050 sold over a month before the start of the new season, a club record. The stadium expansion will eventually allow 9000 spectators. On the same day, Anderlecht comes to an agreement with Oud-Heverlee Leuven to loan out Senegalese midfielder Christophe Diandy for one season, at that point already the fifth incoming transfer for OHL.
 27.06.2011: With second division top scorer Harbaoui transferring to Lokeren, OHL decides to buy a replacement as they sign third division top scorer Patrick Amoah from WS Woluwe. The 24-year-old Swedish forward with roots in Ghana scored 27 goals during the previous season.
 30.06.2011: The transfer of Frederik Boi from Cercle Brugge to OHL is finally concluded as both clubs find an agreement.

Regular season in 2011
 29.07.2011: OHL immediately causes a major upset by beating Anderlecht 2-1 at home on the first matchday due to an injury time winner by Patrick Amoah.
 31.07.2011: The news is released that Kenneth Van Goethem suffered a severe knee-injury during the opening match, ruling him out of contention for at least 6 months.
 04.08.2011: Belgian defensive midfielder Floribert N'Galula is signed from Finnish team TPS Turku to replace the injured Van Goethem.
 10.08.2011: After a week of testing, OH Leuven signs Nigerian striker Derick Ogbu. Ogbu had already tested twice with PSV Eindhoven after being recommended by Henk ten Cate. Eventually he could not be signed by PSV as his visa expired and eventually he ended up at OHL.
 19.08.2011: OH Leuven confirms the signing of Belgian goalkeeper Thomas Kaminski from Beerschot AC. Contrary to earlier reports, Kaminski is not on loan from Anderlecht, but has made a deal with both clubs that he will play one season for Leuven, before moving to Anderlecht.
 23.08.2011: The draw for the 2011–12 Belgian Cup is made, giving OH Leuven a home draw against the winner of the match between Cappellen (4th division) and Rupel Boom (3rd division). Should Leuven win the match, then they will play the next round away to Lommel United, Neerpelt or Anderlecht.
 30.08.2011: Although his contract continued until 2012, Yannick Euvrard moves to second division team Roeselare. Euvrard was part of the team that became 2010–11 Belgian Second Division champions, but seemed not to fit into the plans. After 5 matches without being on the pitch, he decided it was better to leave. On the same day, OH Leuven announced the coming of Czech defender Radek Dejmek, on loan from Slovan Liberec until the end of the season. The contract also includes an option to buy.
 31.08.2011: On the last day of the transfer period, Olympia Wijgmaal loans yet another OHL player as Simon Vermeiren leaves the team for one season at the third division team. Later that day the signing of Belgian international Karel Geraerts is confirmed, after the news had already spread through various media the day before. No transfer sum was paid, as Geraerts did no longer fit into the plans at Club Brugge and was allowed to leave for free
 10.09.2011: During training Kevin Roelandts suffers an ankle injury, ruling him out of contention for at least 3 months.
 21.09.2011: In the Belgian Cup, OH Leuven is immediately eliminated after a 1-2 home loss against Third Division team Rupel Boom. The fact that OH Leuven loses at home, that it is the only team from the Belgian Pro League to be eliminated at that point and that the team missed out on an away match in the next round against Anderlecht causes coach Ronny Van Geneugden to state that "this is my biggest deception in a very long time".
 24.09.2011: During the final minutes of the 1-1 home draw against reigning champions Genk, experienced defender Nicky Hayen suffers a serious injury as he tears one of his anterior cruciate ligaments. Later that evening it is confirmed that it will keep him out of contention for around 6 months. After Kenneth Van Goethem and Kevin Roelandts, Hayen is the third key player to suffer a major injury during the season.
 10.11.2011: After suffering an injury earlier in a match with the Belgium national under-17 football team during the 2012 UEFA European Under-17 Football Championship qualifying round, promising youngster Joren Dehond is diagnosed with a torn meniscus. Joren will need to undergo surgery and will be out for 6 tot 8 weeks. A status update of the other long-term injured players is also given: the revalidation of Kenneth Van Goethem goes well, he is starting with individual running exercises. Kevin Roelandts is already training individually and plans to rejoin the group in about two weeks, while Nicky Hayen is still at the very beginning of his revalidation period, he is not yet allowed to use his right leg.
 12.12.2011: OHL is hit by a fourth major first-team injury as left-back Koen Weuts tears a part of his medial collateral ligament during the home match against Zulte Waregem. It is estimated that Weuts will probably be sidelined for four to six weeks. In recovery he joins first team players Kenneth Van Goethem and Nicky Hayen and youngster Joren Dehond. Meanwhile, Kevin Roelandts is scheduled to play in a friendly match on 14 December, which will be his first match after his ankle injury.
 27.12.2011: At the start of the winter break, after a streak of four unbeaten matches, OHL is in 11th position with 20 points out of 19 matches. Coach Ronny Van Geneugden is very happy with the results, stating that the 11th place is magnificent seeing the number of long term injuries the team had to undergo. Negative points are the early elimination in the Belgian Cup and the fact that OHL could only score few points against direct competitors. Van Geneugden also mentions the huge support from the home fans and how this has helped the team to take points from big teams Anderlecht, Club Brugge and Genk. Finally, he states the end goal is to score 30 points after 30 matches, which should be enough to avoid the relegation playoffs.
 27.12.2011: The 19-year-old nephew of former OHL player Toni Brogno signs for OHL. Belgian youngster Loris Brogno is a left-footed striker, signed from Charleroi and regarded as a prospect for the future.
 28.12.2011: OHL and Swedish striker Patrick Amoah mutually agree to terminate their contract. Amoah was the match winner in the opening match against Anderlecht, scoring the 2-1 goal in injury time. However, after sending the OHL supporters into delirium during this first match, Amoah had faded away and mostly featured in the reserve matches only. Amoah immediately rejoined his former team WS Woluwe.

Regular season in 2012
 10.01.2012: Icelandic defensive midfielder Stefán Gíslason signs a 1.5 year contract after he was released from Lillestrøm. Gíslason, a former youth player of Arsenal, is expected to immediately make an impact in the first team and is signed to take over the role of the injured Nicky Hayen.
 20.01.2012: Thirty-two-year-old striker Ibrahim Salou returns to Belgium as he signs for OHL. After leaving Club Brugge in 2008, Salou had spells in Germany with Duisburg, Denmark with Vejle and USA with the New York Red Bulls. After being released in New York, he had been looking for a club in Belgium and ended up with Oud-Heverlee Leuven.
 26.01.2012: After days of speculating, attacking midfielder Sacha Iakovenko of Anderlecht joins OHL on loan as he had to make a decision over which club to join, either Oud-Heverlee Leuven or Westerlo. Iakovenko had worked with coach Ronny Van Geneugden before at Genk and is delighted to be able to do so again.
 29.01.2012: Club monument Joeri Vastmans leaves the club as both parties agree to terminate the contract. Vastmans, at OHL for 6 seasons and still popular with many of the fans, had only been subbed on once during the season and since he was not guaranteed more opportunities, opted to look for a new club.
 31.01.2012: With several players returning from injury and with the signings of Ibrahim Salou and Sacha Iakovenko, 25-year-old midfielder Tail Schoonjans is deemed surplus and therefore loaned out to second division team Sint-Niklaas. Although Schoonjans only has a contract until the end of the season, OHL has an option to prolong his contract.
 11.02.2012: In a direct relegation battle away to Westerlo, OHL secures a crucial 1-3 victory, moving 8 points clear of the relegation playoffs with only 5 matches to go. Goals came from Wim Raymaekers, Jordan Remacle and Sacha Iakovenko. Iakovenko remained calm after his goal and did not celebrate his goal, as between 2009 and 2011 he nearly played two full seasons for Westerlo. In the media, it is now assumed that 15th and 16th placed teams Westerlo and Sint-Truiden will face each other in the relegation playoffs.
 03.03.2012: After a dull 0-0 draw at home against Lierse, OHL can no longer finishing lower than 14th, thereby avoiding the relegation playoffs and thus qualifying for the 2012–13 Belgian Pro League. For the first time in Belgian football, a team form the city of Leuven manages to spend more than one consecutive season at the highest level.
 13.03.2012: After a successful season as captain of the team in which he also scored three goals, 31-year-old club-icon Bjorn Ruytinx is rewarded with a new one-year contract.

Playoffs
 22.03.2012: After finishing the regular season in 14th place, OHL was paired with Cercle Brugge, Mechelen en Lierse in playoff 2. The draw is released, with OHL starting at home against Lierse.
 27.04.2012: A first transfer for the new season is announced, as Belgian Lierse defender Kenny Thompson signs for OHL.
 05.05.2012: The season ends for OH Leuven as the playoffs conclude with OH Leuven ending in second place behind Cercle Brugge. Leuven ends the playoffs with 10 points out of 18 after losing twice, drawing once and winning three matches.

Team kit
The team kits for the 2011–12 season were produced by Vermarc and the main shirt sponsor was Option.

First team squad
As of 6 May 2012.

Transfers

In

Summer

Winter

Loan In

Summer

Winter

Out

Summer

Winter

Loan Out

Summer

Winter

Statistics

Appearances and goals
Last updated on 6 May 2012.

|-
|colspan="10"|Players who are out on loan

|-
|colspan="10"|Players who have left the club

|}

Top scorers
Includes all competitive matches. The list is sorted by league goals when total goals are equal.

Goals

Last updated: 6 May 2012
Source: Match reports in Competitive matches

Penalties Taken

Goals conceded 
Includes all competitive matches. Sorted by shirt number.

Last updated on 6 May 2012

Penalties Conceded

Disciplinary record
Includes all competitive matches. Players with 1 card or more included only.

Last updated on 6 May 2012

Suspensions during the season 
Includes suspensions for competitive matches.

Last updated on 6 May 2012

Severe injuries during the season 
Last updated on 6 May 2012

Starting 11
Only considering Belgian Pro League starts.

Overall
{|class="wikitable"
|-
|Games played || 37 (36 Belgian Pro League, 1 Belgian Cup)
|-
|Games won || 10 (10 Belgian Pro League, 0 Belgian Cup)
|-
|Games drawn || 9 (9 Belgian Pro League, 0 Belgian Cup)
 |-
|Games lost || 18 (17 Belgian Pro League, 1 Belgian Cup)
|-
|Goals scored || 54
|-
|Goals conceded || 74
|-
|Goal difference || -20
|-
|Clean sheets || 3
|-
|Yellow cards || 75
|-
|Red cards || 3
|-
|Worst discipline ||  Bjorn Ruytinx 13  0 
|-
|Best result(s) ||W 3 - 1 (H) v Mons - Belgian Pro League - 10 September 2011W 3 - 1 (H) v Club Brugge - Belgian Pro League - 18 December 2011W 3 - 1 (A) v Westerlo - Belgian Pro League - 11 February 2012W 3 - 1 (H) v Sint-Truiden - Belgian Pro League - 21 March 2012W 4 - 2 (H) v Mechelen - Belgian Pro League - 21 April 2012
|-
|Worst result(s) ||L 6 - 1 (A) v Gent - Belgian Pro League - 1 October 2011
|-
|Most appearances ||  Jordan Remacle (36)
|-
|Top scorer ||  Jordan Remacle (16)
|-

Club

Coaching staff
{|class="wikitable"
!Position
!Staff
|-
|-
|Head Coach|| Ronny Van Geneugden
|-
|Assistant First Team Coach|| Hans Vander Elst
|-
|Goalkeeping coach|| Jurgen De Braekeleer

Other information

Competitions

Friendly matches

Pre-season

During the season

Belgian Pro League

OHL's first season in the Belgian Pro League began on 29 July 2011.

Regular season

League table

Results summary

Points breakdown

Points at home: 20 
Points away from home: 9 

Points against 2010/11 Playoff 1 teams (6): 12 
Points against 2010/11 Playoff 2 teams (8): 13 
Points against newly promoted teams (1): 4 

6 points: none
4 points: Anderlecht, Lokeren, Mons, Westerlo
3 points: Beerschot, Club Brugge, Sint-Truiden
2 points: none
1 point: Genk, Lierse, Mechelen, Zulte Waregem
0 points: Cercle Brugge, Gent, Kortrijk, Standard Liège

Biggest & smallest
Biggest home win: 3–1 vs. Mons; 3–1 vs. Club Brugge; 3–1 vs. Sint-Truiden
Biggest home defeat: 1–3 vs. Standard Liège; 0–2 vs. Kortrijk
Biggest away win: 1–3 vs. Westerlo
Biggest away defeat: 6–1 vs. Gent; 5–0 vs. Genk

Biggest home attendance: 8,519 vs. Club Brugge and vs. Standard Liège
Smallest home attendance: 5,672 vs. Mons
Biggest away attendance: 24,806 vs. Club Brugge
Smallest away attendance: 4,000 vs. Mons

Results by round

Playoffs
After finishing 14th during the regular season, OHL was placed in Group A of the Europa League Playoff together with Cercle Brugge, Lierse and Mechelen.

Table

Matches

Belgian Cup

References

External links
 

2011-12
Belgian football clubs 2011–12 season
Oud-Heverlee Leuven seasons